Jorge Freitas e Silva Melo (7 August 1948 – 14 March 2022) was a Portuguese actor, theatre director, writer, playwright and translator. In 1973 Melo founded the Teatro da Cornucópia with Luís Miguel Cintra. He received critical acclaim for his work as a playwright.

References

External links 
 

1948 births
2022 deaths
People from Lisbon
Portuguese male film actors
Portuguese theatre directors
Portuguese film directors
Portuguese film critics
20th-century Portuguese dramatists and playwrights
Portuguese screenwriters
Male screenwriters
Commanders of the Order of Liberty
20th-century Portuguese male writers
Portuguese male dramatists and playwrights